This is a list of the National Register of Historic Places listings in Ingham County, Michigan.

This is intended to be a complete list of the properties and districts on the National Register of Historic Places in Ingham County, Michigan, United States. The locations of National Register properties and districts for which the latitude and longitude coordinates are included below, may be seen in an online map.

There are 52 properties and districts listed on the National Register in the county, including 1 National Historic Landmark.



Current listings

|}

Former listings

|}

See also

 List of Michigan State Historic Sites in Ingham County, Michigan
 List of National Historic Landmarks in Michigan
 National Register of Historic Places listings in Michigan
 Listings in neighboring counties: Clinton, Eaton, Jackson, Livingston, Shiawassee, Washtenaw

References

 
Ingham
Buildings and structures in Ingham County, Michigan